Lt.-Col. George Alexander Walker Lamond (23 July 1878 – 25 February 1918) was a Scotland international rugby union player.

He later joined the British Army as an officer, but he died during World War I.

Rugby Union career

Amateur career

He played for Kelvinside Academicals in his native Glasgow.

Provincial career

He was capped by Glasgow District. He scored a drop goal in the Inter-City match of 1898.

International career

Engineering career

His rugby career was interrupted by his professional career; a civil engineer, Lamond joined the firm of Sir John Aird and moved to Egypt. For his services in the Middle East, he was decorated with the Order of the Medjidie and Order of Osmanieh by the Ottoman Empire.

During the First World War, his skills were put to use by the Royal Engineers. He was first deployed to France, where his many engineering projects led to a promotion to lieutenant colonel, and then to Mesopotamia, where he was engaged in building the new Port of Basra over the Tigris and Euphrates. He fell ill with a fever and was sent to Sri Lanka to recover, but his conditioned worsened and he died in February 1918. He is buried in the non-conformist section of Colombo (Kanatte) General Cemetery, in Borella.

References

External links
 "An entire team wiped out by the Great War".  The Scotsman, 6 November 2009

1878 births
1918 deaths
Scottish rugby union players
Scotland international rugby union players
British military personnel killed in World War I
Royal Engineers officers
Kelvinside Academicals RFC players
Rugby union players from Glasgow
Recipients of the Order of the Medjidie
Scottish civil engineers
Glasgow District (rugby union) players
British Army personnel of World War I
Rugby union centres
British expatriates in the Ottoman Empire